The Melaka Governor Cup was an annual professional road bicycle racing classic one-day race held in Malaysia from 2007 to 2014, named after Governor of Malacca. The race previously known as Melaka Chief Minister Cup and His Excellency Governor of Malacca Cup. The race was part of the UCI Asia Tour and was classified by the International Cycling Union (UCI) as 1.2 a category event. The 2014 edition of the race was won by Alexandre Pliușchin of Moldova.

Past winners

External links
 
 Statistics at the-sports.org
 Melaka Governor Cup at cqranking.com

Cycle races in Malaysia
UCI Asia Tour races
Recurring sporting events established in 2007
2007 establishments in Malaysia